is:

 A serial novel of the same title by Kaizan Nakazato , whose adaptations include:
 大菩薩峠 Dai-bosatsu tōge (1957 film)
 大菩薩峠 Satan's Sword, a 1960 film and the first in a trilogy
 The Sword of Doom, a 1966 film